The Roman Catholic Diocese of Broome is a suffragan Latin Rite diocese of the Metropolitan Archdiocese of Perth, covering the Kimberley and Pilbara regions of Western Australia.

Cathedral 
Its cathedral episcopal see is Our Lady Queen of Peace Cathedral, in Broome, Western Australia.

History 
On 10 May 1887, it was established initially as an Apostolic Vicariate of Kimberley in Western Australia, on territory split off from the then Diocese of Perth.

On 4 May 1910, it lost territory to establish the Mission sui juris of Drisdale River, which was later renamed Kalumburu.

On 13 November 1959, it was renamed as Apostolic Vicariate of Kimberleys.

It was elevated and renamed again as a diocese of Broome on 7 June 1966.

In 1980, it regained the territory of the suppressed Mission sui juris of Kalumburu.

Episcopal ordinaries
The following individuals have been appointed apostolic vicar or elected as Roman Catholic Bishop of Broome or any of its precursor titles:
{| class="wikitable"
!Order
!Name
!Title
!Date enthroned
!Reign ended
!Term of office
!Reason for term end
|-
|align="center"| ||William Bernard Kelly † ||Vicar Apostolic of Kimberley in Western Australia ||align="center"|1894 ||align="center"|1909 ||align="right"| ||Resigned whilst earlier elevated as Bishop of Geraldton
|-
|align="center"| ||Fulgentius Torres, OSB † ||Vicar Apostolic of Kimberley in Western Australia||align="center"|5 May 1910 ||align="center"|6 October 1914 ||align="right"| ||Died in office
|-
|align="center"| ||John Creagh, CSsR † ||Vicar Apostolic of Kimberley in Western Australia||align="center"|1914 ||align="center"|1922 ||align="right"| ||Died in office
|-
|align="center"| ||Ernesto Coppo, SDB †||Vicar Apostolic of Kimberley in Western Australia ||align="center"|1 December 1922 ||align="center"|1928 ||align="right"| || Resigned and appointed Vicar Apostolic Emeritus of Kimberley in Western Australia
|-
|rowspan="2" align="center"| ||rowspan="2" |Ottone Raible, SAC †||Apostolic Administrator of Kimberley in Western Australia ||align="center"|18 January 1928 ||align="center"|18 June 1935 ||align="right"| || Elevated as Vicar Apostolic of Kimberley in Western Australia
|-
||Vicar Apostolic of Kimberley in Western Australia ||align="center"|18 June 1935 ||align="center"|12 March 1958 ||align="right"| ||Resigned and appointed Vicar Apostolic Emeritus of Kimberley in Western Australia
|-
|rowspan="2" align="center"| ||rowspan="2" |John Jobst, SAC † ||Vicar Apostolic of Kimberley in Western Australia ||align="center"|13 January 1959 ||align="center"|7 June 1966 ||align="right"| || Elevated as Bishop of Broome
|-
||Bishop of Broome ||align="center"|7 June 1966 ||align="center"|3 November 1995 ||align="right"| ||Retired and appointed Bishop Emeritus of Broome
|-
|align="center"| ||Christopher Saunders ||Bishop of Broome ||align="center"|8 February 1996 ||align="center"|11 March 2020 ||align="right"||| Stood aside, pending investigation
|-
|align="center"| ||Peter Ingham||Apostolic Administrator of Broome, Bishop Emeritus of Wollongong ||align="center"|11 March 2020  ||align="center"|Present ||align="right"||| Pope's official acceptance of prior bishop's resignation and appointment of Bishop of Geraldton as replacement.
|-
|align="center"| ||Michael Henry Morrissey||Apostolic Administrator of Broome, Bishop of Geraldton ||align="center"|28 August 2021  ||align="center"|Present ||align="right"||| n/a
|-
|}

Parishes 
The diocese has nineteen parishes with regular liturgical services held in the following locations, with churches dedicated to particular saints:
 Balgo-Kutjungka (St Theresa)
 Broome (Our Lady Queen of Peace)
 Dampier Peninsula with churches in Beagle Bay (Sacred Heart) and Lombadina (Christ the King)
 Derby (Our Lady of the Holy Rosary) and Fitzroy Crossing (St Francis)
 Halls Creek (St Mary)
 Kalumburu (Our Lady of the Assumption)
 Kununurra (St Vincent Pallotti)
 La Grange-Bidyadanda (St John the Baptist)
 Wyndham (Queen of Apostles)

See also 

 Catholic Church in Australia

References

External links
 Catholic Diocese of Broome
 GigaCatholic 

Roman Catholic Ecclesiastical Province of Perth
Broome, Roman Catholic Diocese of
Broome, Western Australia
1887 establishments in Australia
Roman Catholic dioceses and prelatures established in the 19th century
Religious organizations established in 1887